The Société des Automobiles Alpine SAS, commonly known as Alpine, is a French manufacturer of racing and sports cars established in 1955. The Alpine car marque was created in 1954. 

Jean Rédélé, the founder of Alpine, was originally a Dieppe garage proprietor who began to achieve success in motorsport with one of the few French cars that were produced just after the Second World War, the Renault 4CV. The company has been closely related to Renault through its history, and was bought by it in 1973.

The Alpine competition department merged into Renault Sport in 1976 and the production of Alpine-badged models ceased in 1995.
The Alpine brand was relaunched with the 2017 introduction of the new Alpine A110.  In January 2021, as part of a company revamp, Renault announced that Renault Sport was again merged into Alpine to form an Alpine business unit.

History

Early days 

Using Renault 4CVs, Rédélé gained class wins in a number of major events, including the Mille Miglia and Coupe des Alpes. As his experience with the little 4CV built up, he incorporated many modifications, including for example, special five-speed gearboxes replacing the original three-speed unit. To provide a lighter car he built a number of special versions with lightweight aluminium bodies: he drove in these at Le Mans and Sebring with some success in the early 1950s.

Encouraged by the development of these cars and consequent customer demand, he created the Alpine brand in 1954. It was named "Alpine" after his Coupe des Alpes successes. He did not realise that in England the previous year, Sunbeam had introduced a sports coupe derived from the Sunbeam Talbot and called the "Sunbeam Alpine". This naming issue was to cause problems for Alpine throughout its history.

In 1955, he worked with the carrosserie Chappe et Gessalin to be amongst the pioneers of auto glassfibre construction and produced a small coupe, based on 4CV mechanicals, called the Alpine A106. It used the platform chassis of the original Renault 4CV. The A106 achieved a number of successes through the 1950s and was joined by a low and stylish cabriolet. Styling for this car was contracted to the Italian designer Giovanni Michelotti. Under the glassfibre body was a very stiff chassis based on a central tubular backbone which was to be the hallmark of all Alpines.

Alpine then took the Michelotti cabriolet design and developed a 2+2 closed coupe (or 'berlinette') body for it: this became the Alpine A108, now featuring the Dauphine Gordini 845 cc engine, which on later models was bored out to give a capacity of 904 cc or (subsequently) 998 cc.  The A108 was built between 1958 and 1963.

1960s 

In 1962, the A108 began to be produced also in Brazil, by Willys-Overland. It was the Willys Interlagos (berlineta, coupé and convertible).

By now the car's mechanicals were beginning to show their age in Europe. Alpine was already working closely with Renault and when the Renault R8 saloon was introduced in 1962, Alpine redeveloped their chassis and made a number of minor body changes to allow the use of R8 mechanicals.

This new car was the A110 Berlinette Tour de France, named after a successful run with the Alpine A108 in the 1962 event.

Alpine achieved increasing success in rallying, and by 1968 had been allocated the whole Renault competition budget. The close collaboration allowed Alpines to be sold and maintained in France by normal Renault dealerships. Real top level success started in 1968 with outright wins in the Coupe des Alpes and other international events. By this time the competition cars were fitted with 1440 cc engines derived from the Renault R8 Gordini. Competition successes became numerous, helped since Alpine was the first company fully to exploit the competition parts homologation rules.

1970s 
In 1971, Alpines finished first, second and fourth in the Monte Carlo rally, using cars with engines derived from the Renault 16. In 1973, the newer A110 1800 finished first, second, third, and fifth and went on to win the World Rally Championship outright, beating Porsche, Lancia and Ford. During this time, production of the Alpine A110 increased and manufacturing deals were struck for A110s and A108s with factories in a number of other countries including Spain, Mexico, Brazil and Bulgaria.

With 1973 came the international petrol crisis, which had profound effects on many specialist car manufacturers worldwide. From a total Alpine production of 1421 in 1972, the numbers of cars sold dropped to 957 in 1974 and the company was bailed out via a takeover by Renault. Alpine's problems had been compounded by the need for them to develop a replacement for the A110 and launch the car just when European petrol prices leapt through the roof.

Through the 1970s, Alpine continued to campaign the A110, and later the Alpine A310 replacement car. However, to compete with Alpine's success, other manufacturers developed increasingly special cars, notably the Lancia Stratos which was based closely on the A110's size and rear-engined concept, though incorporating a Ferrari engine. Alpine's own cars, still based on the 1962 design and using a surprising number of production parts, became increasingly uncompetitive. In 1974 Alpine built a series of factory racing Renault 17 Gordinis (one driven by Jean-Luc Thérier) that won the Press on Regardless World Rally Championship round in Michigan, US.

In fact, having achieved the rally championship, and with Renault money now fully behind them, Alpine had set their sights on a new target. The next aim was to win at Le Mans. Renault had also taken over the Gordini tuning firm and merged the two to form Renault Sport. A number of increasingly successful sports racing cars appeared, culminating in the 1978 Le Mans win with the Renault Alpine A442B. This was fitted with a turbo-charged engine; Alpine had been the first company to run in and win an international rally with a turbo car as far back as 1972 when Thérier took a specially modified A110 to victory on the Critérium des Cévennes.

1971 also saw Alpine begin construction of open-wheel racing cars. Initially in Formula Three within a year they were building Formula Two cars as well. However, without a competitive Renault Formula Two engine available, the F2 cars could neither be known as Renaults nor Alpines while powered by Ford-Cosworth and BMW engines and were labelled Elf 2 and later Elf 2J. A Renault 2.0 litre engine arrived in time for Jean-Pierre Jabouille to win the European Formula 2 Championship in 1976. By this time Alpine with Jabouille driving had built a Formula One car as a testing mule which lead directly to their entry into the Formula One World Championship in 1977. A second European Formula 2 championship followed with René Arnoux in 1977 with the customer Martini team, before Alpine sold the F2 operation to Willi Kauhsen to concentrate on the Le Mans and Formula One programs.

1980s 
Alpine Renault continued to develop their range of models all through the 1980s. The A310 was the next modern interpretation of the A110. The Alpine A310 was a sports car with a rear-mounted engine and was initially powered by a four-cylinder 1.6 L sourced Renault 17 TS/Gordini engine. In 1976 the A310 was restyled by Robert Opron and fitted with the more powerful and newly developed V6 PRV engine. The 2.6 L motor was modified by Alpine with a four-speed manual gearbox. Later they would use a Five-speed manual gearbox and with the group 4 model get a higher tune with more cubic capacity and 3 twin barrel Weber carburetors.

After the A310 Alpine transformed into the new Renault Alpine GTA range produced from plastic and polyester components, commencing with normally aspirated PRV V6 engines. In 1985 the V6 turbo was introduced to complete the range. This car was faster and more powerful than the normally aspirated version. In 1986 polyester parts were cut for the first time by robot using a high pressure (3500 bar) water jet,  in diameter at three times the speed of sound. In the same year the American specification V6 turbo was developed.

In 1987 the installation of anti-pollution systems allowed the V6 turbo to be distributed to Switzerland, Germany, Austria and the Netherlands. 1989 saw the launch of the limited edition GTA Mille Miles to celebrate Alpine's 35th anniversary. Production was limited to 100 cars, all fitted with ABS braking, polished wheels, special leather interior and paintwork. This version was not available in RHD.

1990s 

1990 saw the launch of the special edition wide-bodied GTA Le Mans. This model was available in the UK and RHD versions carried a numbered plaque on the dashboard. The Le Mans is the most collectable and valuable GTA derivative, since only 325 were made (299 LHD and 26 RHD). These were available from Renault dealers in the UK and the country's motoring press are belatedly recognising the GTA series as the 'great unsung supercar of the 1980s'.

The Alpine A610 was launched in 1991. It was re-styled inside and out but was still recognisable as a GTA derivative. The chassis structure was extensively reworked but the central box principal remained the same. The front was completely re-designed the interior was also greatly improved. Air-conditioning and power steering were fitted as standard. The total production run for A610s derivatives was 818 vehicles 67 RHD and 751 LHD. After production of the A610 ended, the Alpine factory in Dieppe produced the Renault Sport Spider and a new era was to begin.

The last Alpine, an A610, rolled off the Dieppe line on 7 April 1995, Renault abandoning the Alpine name. This was always a problem in the UK market. Alpines could not be sold in the UK under their own name because Sunbeam owned the trade mark (because of the mid-50s Sunbeam Alpine Mk I). In the 1970s, for example Dieppe were building modified Renault 5s for the worldwide market. The rest of the world knew them as R5 Alpines but in the UK they had to be renamed to R5 Gordini. After numerous company takeovers the multinational Stellantis own the British Alpine trademark as of January 2021.

The Alpine factory in Dieppe continued to expand; in the 1980s they built the special R5 Turbo cars, following the rear engined formula they have always used. They built all Clio Williams and RenaultSport Spiders. The factory put its Alpine badges on the early batches of the mid-engined Clio series one Clio V6. The Clio Series 2 was also assembled there with more recent RenaultSport Clio 172 and RenaultSport Clio 182s.

Between 1989 and 1995, a new Alpine named the A710 "Berlinette 2", was designed and two prototypes were built. Due to the cost of the project (600 million francs), and as adding modern equipment and interior would compromise the price and performances, the project was canceled.

21st century: relaunch of the Alpine marque 

In October 2007, it was reported that Renault's marketing boss Patrick Blain had revealed that there were plans for several sports cars in Renault's future lineup, but stressed that the first model would not arrive until after 2010. Blain confirmed that Renault was unlikely to pick a new name for its future sports car and would probably go with Alpine to brand it. Blain described it as being a “radical sports car” and not just a sports version of a regular model.

The new Alpine sports car was to have a version of the Nissan GT-R's Premium Midship platform.

In France, there is a large network of Alpine enthusiasts clubs. Clubs exist in many countries including the UK, USA, Australia, and Japan.

In February 2009, Renault confirmed that plans to revive the Alpine brand had been frozen as a direct result of the 2008–2009 global financial crisis and recession.

In May 2012, images of a new Renault Alpine concept titled as Renault Alpine A110-50 were leaked prior to its debut in Monaco. Its styling was based on the Renault DeZir presented in 2010.

In November 2012, Renault and Caterham Cars announced the purchasing by the latter of a 50% stake in the Renault's wholly owned subsidiary Société des Automobiles Alpine to create a joint venture (Société des Automobiles Alpine Caterham or SAAC) owned equally by both parts, with the aim of developing affordable sport cars under the Alpine (for Renault) and Caterham (for Caterham Cars) brands, which would be available in 2016.  In this partnership, Caterham acquired 50% ownership of the Renault's Dieppe assembly plant assets. On 10 June 2014, Renault announced it would be repurchasing the stake from Caterham Cars in SAAC, renaming it Société des Automobiles Alpine. During 2015, two new Alpine concepts were introduced: the Alpine Celebration, unveiled at the Le Mans race weekend, and the CGI-created Alpine Vision Gran Turismo. In February 2016, at an event held in Monte Carlo, Groupe Renault's chief Carlos Ghosn unveiled the Alpine Vision showcar (a model close to the planned production Alpine) and announced a 2017 relaunch for the Alpine brand. The Vision was later presented at the 86th Geneva Motor Show by Alpine.
The production version reused the A110 name and the first official pictures were revealed on 28 February 2017 prior to the unveiling at the 87th Geneva Motor show.

On 10 December 2020, Alpine and MV Agusta announced that they would make a special edition of the MV Agusta Superveloce influenced by the Alpine A110 called the Superveloce 800 Alpine, there would be approximately 110 models made.

In January 2021, Alpine said it would absorb the Renault Sport entities (Renault Sport Cars and Renault Sport Racing), merging them with the existing Alpine operations to form a new Alpine business unit. The company also said it had signed a memorandum of understanding with Lotus Cars to co-develop an electric successor for the A110. In May 2021, Les Ulis-based Renault Sport Cars was officially renamed as Alpine Cars and turned into the main development hub for Alpine as well as the whole Renault group sports cars.

Operations

Dieppe plant
The first assembly plant for Alpine was at a small workshop owned by Rédélé on the Pasteur avenue in Dieppe. In 1969, to cope with increasing demand, the assembly was moved to a larger facility on de Bréauté avenue, its present location.

The Dieppe plant has 3.8 hectares of covered buildings. , it had 386 employees.

The plant is semi-automatised, with high worker input (before the launch of the 2017 A110, vehicles were almost completely hand-built) and focused on low-volume, high quality assembly. It can produce an average of 15 A110s per day. The plant press neither steel nor aluminium (the A110s are mostly built on prefabricated alloy panels). The plant has not a welding section, as the A110 chassis and bodywork are riveted and glued on a special assembly line and moved to a low-temperature coating plant (able to paint both the alloy and plastic elements) and then to a sanding robot (to remove imperfections) and wiping robot (to clean the vehicle). Final assembly is made on a single line, with logistics teams preparing beforehand the vehicle's components to travel along the line with it. Cockpits are assembled and put on by the side and pre-assembled powertrains are put on the rear. Apart from low-volume cars, the Dieppe plant also assembles racing cars (as the Clio Rally4, a rallying car based on the fifth-generation Renault Clio), co-develops racing cars, produces and sells parts for racing cars,  and tunes engines.

From the late 1970s, Alpine's Dieppe plant produced Renault Sport models and, after the discontinuation of the Alpine brand in 1995, it became its main focus. Renault Sport models produced over time by Alpine include: Renault 5 Turbo, Renault Sport Spider, Clio Renault Sport, Mégane Renault Sport. The last Renault Sport model produced by Dieppe aimed at the mainstream market was the fourth-generation Clio Renault Sport, which was put out of production at the site in 2018. Between 2015 and 2016, the plant also assembled the Bolloré Bluecar.

Alpine Racing

Alpine Racing is the Alpine's motorsport division. It is made up of the Alpine subsidiaries Alpine Racing Limited (an Enstone-based operation) and Alpine Racing SAS (Viry-Châtillon) mainly for running the company Formula One programme and a partnership with Signatech for other programmes.

The Alpine competition department had various racing programmes from the early 1960s onwards. At the end of 1976, the department was merged with Gordini to form Renault Sport. Some Alpine racing activities continued after that, including a 1978 Le Mans 24 overall victory with the Renault Alpine A442, partnering its parent Renault.

In 2013, as part of the promotional activities for the launching of Alpine roadcars, Alpine partnered with Signatech to enter a Nissan-powered, Oreca-built prototype into the European Le Mans Series championship's LMP2 class, re-establishing Alpine-badged racing activities. Signatech-Alpine won the team championship. They returned for the 2014 season. In 2015, the Signatech-Alpine combination entered into the World Endurance Championship (WEC)'s LMP2 class, achieving the 2016 and 2019-2020 championships and winning three Le Mans 24 races. Through its partnership with Signatech, Alpine also launched GT4's touring car and rallying programmes for its A110.

In September 2020, Groupe Renault announced it would rename its existing Formula One team as Alpine F1 Team. In January 2021, the Alpine company said it would absorb all existing Renault Sport Racing activities besides Formula One.

In March 2021, Alpine presented the Alpine Endurance Team, a WEC's top class team managed by Signatech and using a "grandfathered" Rebellion R13. In October 2021, Alpine said it would enter two WEC prototypes built on the LMDh rules from 2024 onwards, with the running side managed again by Signatech. Oreca was announced as the chassis main developer and builder (assisted by Alpine Racing's Enstone operation) and the engine development side would be carried out by Alpine Racing's Viry-Châtillon base.

Alpine models

Street models

Current
 A110 (2017–present)

Former
 A106 (1955–1961)
 A108 (1958–1965)
 A110 (1963–1977)
 A310 (1971–1984)
 GTA/A610 (1984–1991)
 Mini Alpine (1970)

Racing models

Alpine M63
Alpine M64
Alpine M65
Alpine A210, Group 6
Alpine A220
Alpine A360, Formula Three
Alpine A364
Alpine A367, Formula Two, also known as Elf 2
Alpine A440
Alpine A441, Group 5
Alpine A442, Group 6
Alpine A443
Alpine A450 (revised Oreca 03)
Alpine A460 (revised Oreca 05)
Alpine A470 (revised Oreca 07)
Alpine A480 (revised Rebellion R13)
Alpine A521
Alpine A522

Alpines outside France

Brazil 
The Alpine 108 was produced in Brazil from 1962 to 1966, under license by Willys-Overland do Brasil, branded "Willys Interlagos". It was the first Brazilian sports car.

Bulgaria 

Bulgaria produced its own version of an Alpine, known as Bulgaralpine from 1967 to 1969. About 150 vehicles were produced.

Canada 
A few examples of the Alpine GTA were imported into the Canadian province of Quebec, with the expectation that AMC/Renault would be adding the model to their Canadian lineup. The GTA was designed by Renault to meet North American standards, however plans to import the GTA to North America were cancelled by Chrysler shortly after their takeover of AMC.

Mexico 
Mexico produced its own version of the Renault Alpine, known as Dinalpin, from 1965 to 1974, assembled by DINA S.A., which also manufactured other Renault models under license. About 600 vehicles were produced.

Notes

References

External links 

 

Automobiles Alpine
Defunct motor vehicle manufacturers of France
Renault
Sports car manufacturers
Rear-engined vehicles
Cars introduced in 1955
Vehicle manufacturing companies established in 1955
Re-established companies
French racecar constructors
French brands
24 Hours of Le Mans teams
French Formula 3 teams
Car brands
Luxury motor vehicle manufacturers
French companies established in 1955